Donna Allen may refer to:
Donna Allen (singer) (born 1958), American singer
Donna Allen (activist) (1920–1999), American activist
Donna Allen, a character in the film Alias Nick Beal